Roger Edwards (born 1946) is a former Royal Marine who has served as a Member of the Legislative Assembly for the Camp constituency since the 2009 general election, winning re-election in 2013 and 2017. He was previously a Member of the Legislative Council from 2001–2005 and is the father of former MLA Emma Edwards.

Edwards joined the Royal Marines in 1963, but transferred to the Royal Navy's Fleet Air Arm in September 1965, before going on to the Britannia Royal Naval College during which time he trained to be a pilot at RAF Linton-on-Ouse. From 1973 to 1975, Edwards served on HMS Endurance while it patrolled Falklands territorial waters. He was attached to the Special Air Service in 1982 during the Falklands war.

In 1982 Edwards retired from the armed forces and bought a farm on West Falkland with his wife, Norma (a Falkland Islander and former member of the Legislative Council). His current portfolios as an MLA are Treasury & Taxation and Europe.

References

1946 births
Military personnel from Wiltshire
Living people
Falkland Islands Councillors 2001–2005
Falkland Islands MLAs 2009–2013
Falkland Islands MLAs 2013–2017
Falkland Islands MLAs 2017–2021
People from Wiltshire
Royal Navy personnel of the Falklands War
Royal Navy officers
Royal Marines ranks
English emigrants to the Falkland Islands